Maurice Arthur Pryor (23 June 1911 – 20 December 1969) was an English brewing executive who served as President of the Institute of Brewing.

Life
Maurice Arthur Pryor was born on 23 June 1911, the son of Major John Arthur Pryor. In 1935, he married Veronica Beatrice (died 1992), daughter of Major Aynsley Eyre Greenwell and Beatrice Lilian née Sanderson, and had one son and three daughters.

Following schooling at Stowe, he joined Truman, Hanbury, Buxton & Co. as a Director in 1934, a brewery which had merged with the Pryor family brewery in 1816 and where his father was on the Board. His career was interrupted by the Second World War, when he joined the Royal Navy Volunteer Reserve. He became a Lieutenant Commander in 1940, serving in Light Coastal forces. After he was demobilised, he returned to his old brewery as a member of the Board; in 1964 he succeeded his father (who had been in the post for 19 years) as Chairman. Alongside that post, he was chairman of Daniell & Sons Breweries, Ltd., Haven Inns Ltd., Russell’s Gravesend Brewery Ltd. and The Writtle Brewery Co. Ltd., alongside other directorships.

Pryor took an active interest in the Institute of Brewing, of which he was a member for 28 years; he was on the Research Board and the Research Policy Committee, and served as President between 1958 and 1960. He was also Chairman of the Brewers' Society between 1962–64 and Master of the Brewers' Company in 1962; he therefore held the rare distinction of chairing the three leading professional organisations for the brewing industry.

In his private life, Pryor enjoyed sailing. Professionally, he encouraged information exchange through the European Brewery Convention and, according to an obituary in the IOB's journal, he possessed a "very wide knowledge of all aspects of the industry and ... shrewd judgement." He died, suddenly at his home, on 21 December 1969.

Likenesses
 Maurice Arthur Pryor by Rex Coleman, for Baron Studios (5 x 4 inch film negative), 25 November 1963. National Portrait Gallery, London (Photographs Collection, NPG x191766. Given by Godfrey Argent, 1999).

References

1911 births
1969 deaths
English brewers
Masters of the Worshipful Company of Brewers
20th-century English businesspeople